Lake is an unincorporated community in Logan County, West Virginia, United States. Lake has a post office with ZIP code 25121.

The community was named after Nicholas Lake, the original owner of the town site.

References

Unincorporated communities in Logan County, West Virginia
Unincorporated communities in West Virginia